Quri Pawkara (Quechua quri gold, pawkara a species of bird, (possibly Russet-backed oropendola) also spelled Coripaucara) is a  mountain in the Wansu mountain range in the Andes of Peru, about  high. It is situated in the Apurímac Region, Antabamba Province, in the districts of Antabamba and Juan Espinoza Medrano. Its three peaks lie in a row from north to south northwest of Quri Waraqa.

References 

Mountains of Peru
Mountains of Apurímac Region